Néstor Ítalo Julio Isella Ferlini (May 6, 1937 – November 20, 2015) was an Argentine-Chilean professional footballer and head coach who played as a midfielder for clubs of Argentina and Chile. He was born in Rafaela, Argentina.

Clubs (Player)
 Unión de Santa Fe 1956–1959
 Boca Juniors 1960
 Gimnasia y Esgrima de La Plata 1961
 River Plate 1962
 Universidad Católica 1963–1970

Clubs (Head coach)
 Unión Española 1971–1972
 Palestino 1973
 Universidad Católica 1973
 Deportes Concepción 1974
 Universidad Católica 1978
 Audax Italiano 1978–1979
 Coquimbo Unido 1979
 Audax Italiano 1979–1980

Personal life
From 1990 to 2001, Isella worked as a football commentator and analyst for the Chilean TV channel Canal 13, making a renowned pair alongside Alberto Fouillioux in the TV program .

Honours
 Universidad Católica 1966 Chilean Primera División

References

External links
 
 Néstor Isella at Cruzados 

1937 births
2015 deaths
Argentine sportspeople of Italian descent
People from Rafaela
Sportspeople from Santa Fe Province
Argentine footballers
Argentine expatriate footballers
Unión de Santa Fe footballers
Boca Juniors footballers
Club de Gimnasia y Esgrima La Plata footballers
Club Atlético River Plate footballers
Club Deportivo Universidad Católica footballers
Argentine Primera División players
Chilean Primera División players
Argentine expatriate sportspeople in Chile
Expatriate footballers in Chile
Association football midfielders
Argentine football managers
Argentine expatriate football managers
Expatriate football managers in Chile
Argentine emigrants to Chile
Naturalized citizens of Chile
Chilean football managers
Unión Española managers
Club Deportivo Palestino managers
Club Deportivo Universidad Católica managers
Deportes Concepción (Chile) managers
Audax Italiano managers
Coquimbo Unido managers
Chilean Primera División managers
Chilean association football commentators